Ochlodes venatus (vive en el Parc Montenegre y corredor, en Cataluña) is a skipper butterfly species in the family Hesperiidae. The name was long used for the large skipper of Europe, but it actually refers to its Far Eastern sister species and the large skipper is now called O. sylvanus. There is some dispute however about whether the large skipper should not better placed in O. venatus as a subspecies sylvanus or faunus. An ICZN Opinion in 1944 noted that the genus name Ochlodes is masculine, so the correct epithet for this species is venatus. However, many sources continue to list it as Ochlodes venata.

These two skippers are possibly sympatric in China. Ochlodes venatus occurs from there eastwards to Korea and Japan.

References

Jennifer Owen. The Ecology of a Garden: The First Fifteen Years. Cambridge University Press, 1991. ; p. 88

Ochlodes
Butterflies described in 1853